, is a Japanese singer and actor. He is currently a member of  SixTONES.

Career
Morimoto was scouted by Johnny Kitagawa to join the talent agency Johnny & Associates in 2006.

He entered the Johnny's Jr. group, Tap Kids, in 2007 and made his first stage appearance in "Takizawa Enbujo 2007". He also participated in "DREAM BOYS" and starred in "God of Examination" and "Love and Devil ~ Vampire ☆ Boy" in 2007.

In 2009, Morimoto passed the audition to starred as the lead role, Harada Sota, in the movie "Snow Prince – Forbidden Love Melody". On October 15, 2009, the movie premiered in Antwerp, Belgium and he was appointed as the "Friendship Ambassador of Flanders Tourism Board, Belgium" along with Yuma Nakayama. On November 1, 2009, Morimoto was appointed as the leader of a newly formed temporary Johnny's Jr. unit, Snow Prince, consisting of 11 members. The group later made a CD debut titled "Snow Prince" on December 2, 2009.

In 2012, he starred as the lead role, Tatsuya Sakuragi, in NTV's Shiritsu Bakaleya Koukou. The drama was later extended to a movie sequel, in which he retained the same lead role as Tatsuya Sakuragi. He also appeared in "GTO: Remake Season 1 " in the same year, which was a remake of the live adaption drama series in 1998. In the following year, Morimoto appeared in another school drama, "Kasuka na Kanojo".

In May 2015, Morimoto became part of the Johnny Jr. unit, SixTones, which consist of most of Bakaleya main cast. The group is scheduled to make their CD debut on January 22, 2020. Alongside with SixTONES, Morimoto co-starred in a few stage shows, such as the long historic Shounentachi, for every year since 2015–2019 with another Johnny's Jr. group Snow Man.

In 2019, Morimoto starred in prime time drama series "Kansatsui Asagao" as Takuma Morimoto.

Personal life
Morimoto's older brother is Ryutaro Morimoto, a former member of Hey! Say! JUMP.

Filmography

Television

Film

Special Drama

References

Living people
1997 births
Japanese male pop singers
Male actors from Kanagawa Prefecture